Robert Xowie (born August 27, 1962 in the Wetr district of Lifou) is a New Caledonian politician and pro-independence advocate.  A Kanak of the Siloam tribe, Xowie served as President of Loyalty Islands Province from 1999 until 2004, as well as mayor of Lifou from 1995 until 2001.

References

1962 births
Living people
Mayors of places in New Caledonia
Kanak people
People from the Loyalty Islands